Óscar Andrés López Arias is a Costa Rican politician with the Accessibility without Exclusion party. He ran for the President of Costa Rica in February 2010 and received 35,215 votes (1.91%), finishing in 5th place. In the same year, he ran for Mayor of San José in the December 2010 municipal elections. He also ran for president in 2014. He is blind.

In 2015, he published a book entitled 'Con los ojos del alma' (English: 'with the eyes of the soul').

References

Year of birth missing (living people)
Living people
Costa Rican politicians
People from San José, Costa Rica
Costa Rican disability rights activists
Blind politicians